Instant Music may refer to more than one thing:

 Instant Music (software), interactive music software by Electronic Arts
 "Instant Music", a song by The Pillows on their album, Runners High